Mazıdağı is a town and seat of the Mazıdağı District of Mardin Province in Turkey. The town is populated by Kurds of the Dimilî tribe and had a population of 13,117 in 2021.

Politics 
In the local elections of 2009 Hasip Aktas was elected as mayor as a member of the Democratic Society Party (DTP) with 57% of all votes. In the local elections of 2014, Necia Yıldırım from the DTP became Mayor. In the municipal elections of 2019, Nalan Özaydın from the Peoples' Democratic Party was elected as Mayor of Mazıdağı. On the 15 November 2019 she was detained over alleged terror links. The next day she was dismissed.

Ressources 
Mazıdağı region is very rich in phosphate mines.

References

External links
 Mazıdağı website

Populated places in Mardin Province
Mazıdağı District
Kurdish settlements in Mardin Province